Li Zhixing (born 8 November 1985) is a former Chinese footballer. He was released by Guangzhou Pharmaceutical at the end of season 2008. He previously plays for Hong Kong First Division League club TSW Pegasus. The last he played as a striker for Indonesia Super League club Persibo Bojonegoro before release after one match.

Career Statistics in Hong Kong
As of 11 September 2009

References

External links
Profile at Sohu Sports

1985 births
Living people
Footballers from Guangzhou
Chinese footballers
Guangzhou F.C. players
Shenzhen F.C. players
TSW Pegasus FC players
Persibo Bojonegoro players
Indonesian Premier Division players
Expatriate footballers in Hong Kong
Expatriate footballers in Indonesia
Chinese expatriate footballers
Chinese expatriate sportspeople in Hong Kong
Chinese expatriate sportspeople in Indonesia
Association football forwards